In disciplinary procedures, the motion to declare the chair vacant is used as a remedy to misconduct or dereliction of duty by the chairperson of a deliberative assembly, when the rules allow it. It is usually combined with a motion to elect a new chair.

Explanation and use
Robert's Rules of Order Newly Revised allows this motion to be used if the offending occupant of the chair is not the regular presiding officer of a society, in which case it is a question of privilege affecting the assembly. If the chair is the regular presiding officer, the motion to declare the chair vacant cannot be used. However, the assembly could temporarily remove the chair for the meeting using a suspension of the rules. The bylaws of the organization would determine how to permanently remove the officer.

Demeter's Manual states that the procedure is to either bring charges against him for neglect of duty as presiding officer or abolish his term of office by amending the bylaws with due notice to all members; either of these methods requires a two-thirds vote.

Mason's Manual provides, "A presiding officer who has been elected by the house may be removed by the house upon a majority vote of all the members elected, and a new presiding officer pro tempore elected and qualified. When there is no fixed term of office, an officer holds office at the pleasure of the body, or until a successor is elected and qualified."

Examples
An attempt was made to depose Joseph Gurney Cannon as Speaker of the U.S. House of Representatives in 1910, and another in 2015 for John Boehner using this motion. A similar motion was introduced in the Texas legislature to remove Tom Craddick.

References

Incidental motions